David Morley Charleston (27 May 1848 – 30 June 1934) was a Cornish-born Australian politician. Born in St Erth, Cornwall, he received only a primary education before becoming an apprentice engineer at Harvey & Co ironworks, and later an engineering unionist in the Amalgamated Society of Engineers in London. In 1874 he moved to San Francisco and worked as a marine engineer for Pacific Mail Steamship Company. Migrating to South Australia in 1884, he continued his engineering work initially on the Hackney Bridge for the Road Board then with the Adelaide Steamship Company, but resigned in 1887 after labour troubles. He subsequently became President of the United Trades and Labour Council of South Australia for a year from February 1889.

In 1891 he was elected to the South Australian Legislative Council as a Labor member, but he left the United Labor Party in 1897 and resigned his seat. He was re-elected as an independent at the resulting by-election. Leaving the Council in 1901, he was elected to the Australian Senate as a Free Trader. He was defeated in 1903, and was later General Secretary of the Farmers and Producers Political Union. Several attempts to re-enter the Senate were unsuccessful. Charleston died in 1934.

Personal
Charleston married Mary Foster née Cooke on 24 December 1895. Mary was the daughter of William Cooke of the Britannia Iron Works, Melbourne, and a well-known singer and widow of Fanny Simonsen's pianist Charles Bunbury Foster, who may have died in Queensland in 1894, but details are elusive.

Charleston's sister was the suffragist Nellie Martel.

See also
Hundred of Charleston

References

1848 births
1934 deaths
Australian people of Cornish descent
British emigrants to Australia
Free Trade Party members of the Parliament of Australia
Members of the Australian Senate for South Australia
Members of the Australian Senate
Members of the South Australian Legislative Council
Australian trade unionists
Australian Labor Party members of the Parliament of South Australia
20th-century Australian politicians